The Magritte Award for Best First Feature Film (French: Magritte du meilleur premier film) is an award presented annually by the Académie André Delvaux. It is one of the Magritte Awards, which were established to recognize excellence in Belgian cinematic achievements.

It was introduced in 2013 as an audience award. However, its first winner Dead Man Talking was announced during the 66th Cannes Film Festival, three months later the 3rd Magritte Awards ceremony. In 2016, the Magritte Award for Best First Feature Film became a merit category. As of the 2022 ceremony, Playground is the most recent winner in this category.

Winners and nominees
In the list below, winners are listed first in the colored row, followed by the other nominees.

2010s

2020s

References
Sources

 
 
 

Footnotes

External links
 Magritte Awards official website
 Magritte Award for Best First Feature Film at AlloCiné

2011 establishments in Belgium
Awards established in 2011
Awards for best film
Directorial debut film awards
Lists of films by award
First Feature Film